The Maryland Woman Suffrage Association (MWSA) was a woman's suffrage organization in Maryland, founded in 1889.

About 
The Maryland Woman Suffrage Association (MWSA) was created  to fight for women's suffrage in Maryland. Carolyn Hallowell Miller started the group on January 11, 1889. The group included both men and women. MWSA met in members' homes and worked to plan statewide conventions and conferences.

The first president was Miller, though she served only a short time and was followed by Mary Bentley Thomas. In 1902, MWSA opened a headquarters in Baltimore. In 1904, Emma Maddox Funck became president of MWSA. MWSA invited the National American Woman Suffrage Association (NAWSA) to hold their 1906 conference in Baltimore.

In 1910, MWSA worked closely with Elizabeth King Ellicott and presented a bill for suffrage for all to the Maryland House of Delegates. The bill was soundly rejected by the delegates. In 1911, there was a split in the group, with some leaving MWSA to form the State Equal Franchise League of Maryland. MWSA continued to provide an amendment for women's suffrage in the Maryland Constitution in 1912, 1914 and 1916, with no success.

Notable members 

Emma Maddox Funck, President.
Etta Haynie Maddox, Corresponding secretary.

References 

1889 establishments in Maryland
Women's suffrage advocacy groups in the United States
Women's clubs in the United States
History of women in Maryland